Bridget Walsh Moore is a Democratic member of the Missouri House of Representatives, representing the state's 93rd House district.

Career
Walsh Moore graduated from Ursuline Academy in St. Louis in 2006 and Bradley University's Institute of International Studies in 2010. She also became certified in international trade through the World Trade Center, and was a founding member of the North Broadway Business Development Community.

She defeated Republican Gabriel Jones in the November 3, 2020 general election, and considers Medicaid expansion and disabilities rights to be top priorities.

Electoral History 
 Rep. Walsh Moore has not yet had any opponents in the Democratic primary elections, thus she has been nominated each time by default.

Personal life
Walsh Moore is a cancer survivor and amputee. She and her husband Greg are active members of Our Lady of Sorrows Catholic Church.

References

Living people
21st-century American politicians
21st-century American women politicians
Women state legislators in Missouri
Bradley University alumni
Democratic Party members of the Missouri House of Representatives
Year of birth missing (living people)